Mother Gets Married (Swedish: Mamma gifter sig) is a 1937 Swedish comedy film directed by Ivar Johansson and starring Carl Barcklind, Margit Manstad and Annalisa Ericson. It was shot at the Kristallsalongen Studios in Stockholm and on location in the city. The film's sets were designed by the art director Bertil Duroj.

Synopsis
When her widowed mother plans to sell a hotel she owns, her daughter goes to investigate the business undercover.

Cast
 Carl Barcklind as 	Berner
 Margit Manstad as Mrs. Lena Helling
 Annalisa Ericson as 	Mona Helling
 Nils Ohlin as 	Folke Berner
 Georg Funkquist as 	Ambrosius Andersson
 Torsten Bergström as 	Porter
 Hugo Björne as 	Albert Meyer
 Olle Törnquist as 	Håkan Wallenius
 Lars Seligman as Astervall
 Gösta Bodin as 	Angry hotel guest 
 Artur Cederborgh as 	Police officer
 Albin Erlandzon as 	Police officer 
 Arthur Fischer as Hotel guest in restaurant 
 Elsa Holmquist as Kajsa 
 Nils Johannisson as Hotel guest 
 Eivor Landström as 	Meyer's secretary 
 John Norrman as Jönsson 
 Robert Ryberg as 	Police officer 
 Saga Sjöberg as 	Maid 
 Hugo Tranberg as 	Taxi driver 
 Lisa Wirström as 	Hotel guest

References

Bibliography 
 Qvist, Per Olov & von Bagh, Peter. Guide to the Cinema of Sweden and Finland. Greenwood Publishing Group, 2000.

External links 
 

1937 films
Swedish comedy films
1937 comedy films
1930s Swedish-language films
Films directed by Ivar Johansson
Swedish black-and-white films
Films shot in Stockholm
1930s Swedish films